Malacothamnus davidsonii, also known by the common names Davidson's bushmallow and Davidson's bush mallow, is a species of flowering plant in the mallow family.

Distribution
Malacothamnus davidsonii is endemic to California, where it grows in chaparral, oak woodland, and other habitats on slopes.
It is known from three California regions:
the southern San Francisco Bay Area in and around San Mateo County. 
the Santa Lucia Mountains of the Outer South California Coast Ranges, Monterey Ranger District of Los Padres National Forest, in southern Monterey County. 
the Transverse Ranges including the San Gabriel Mountains, and the eastern San Fernando Valley, in Los Angeles County.

Description
Malacothamnus davidsonii is an erect shrub with a thick, multibranched stem reaching  in maximum height. It is coated densely in short, woolly fibers, appearing feltlike.

The thick, hairy leaves are rounded, divided into several dull lobes, and wavy along the edges. The largest leaves may approach 20 centimeters long.

The inflorescence is an elongated cluster of many pale pink, hairy flowers with oval or somewhat triangular petals about half a centimeter long.

See also
California chaparral and woodlands — ecoregion.
Flora of the California chaparral and woodlands

References

External links
Jepson Manual Treatment: Malacothamnus davidsonii
USDA Plants Profile for Malacothamnus davidsonii (Davidson's bushmallow)
Malacothamnus davidsonii — U.C. Photo gallery

davidsonii
Endemic flora of California
Natural history of the California chaparral and woodlands
Natural history of the California Coast Ranges
Natural history of San Mateo County, California
Natural history of Monterey County, California
Natural history of Los Angeles County, California
Monterey Ranger District, Los Padres National Forest
Critically endangered flora of California